Navdeep Singh Poonia (born 11 May 1986) is a Scottish cricket player. He is a right-handed batsman and right-arm medium fast bowler. He has played One Day Internationals for Scotland, and was selected for his country for the 2007 Cricket World Cup. He has also played for Warwickshire in English county cricket. He currently plays for Pelsall Cricket Club in the West Midlands.

In the 2008 ICC World T20 Qualifier against Bermuda, Navdeep Poonia played the patient innings of unbeaten 38 off 54 balls without hitting even a single boundary or a six, which is also the longest ever T20I innings by any player without hitting a single six or a boundary. He's also the only player to record a 30+ score in T20I history without scoring a boundary or a six.

References
Notes

Sources
Cricket Archive profile

Living people
1986 births
Scotland One Day International cricketers
Scottish cricketers
Scotland Twenty20 International cricketers
Warwickshire cricketers
Warwickshire Cricket Board cricketers
Staffordshire cricketers
Cricketers from Glasgow
Scottish people of Indian descent
British Asian cricketers